Twisted Pixel Games, LLC is an American video game developer based in Austin, Texas. Originally a contractor, Twisted Pixel releases games based on its own intellectual properties such as The Maw and 'Splosion Man. The company uses its own proprietary engine, known as Beard, to power its games. On October 12, 2011, it was announced that Twisted Pixel had become part of Microsoft Studios. However, Twisted Pixel separated from Microsoft, and became an independent company again on September 30, 2015. In November 2021, the company became a subsidiary of Oculus Studios.

History
Twisted Pixel Games was founded in 2006 by industry veterans Michael Wilford, Frank Wilson and Josh Bear. The company first performed contract work for the now-defunct Midway Games, providing engineering work for NBA Ballers: Chosen One and Blitz: The League II. In 2008, Twisted Pixel announced that its focus had changed to digitally distributed games based on its own new intellectual properties. In 2008, the company moved from Madison, Indiana, to its current location in Austin. According to the then CEO, Michael Wilford, the move was to "tap into a broader talent pool."

Initially, Twisted Pixel targeted WiiWare as its service of choice. Speaking of the 2005 planned state of the service, Wilford said, "Back then, WiiWare was planned to be more like Xbox Live Arcade." He noted the original plans for the service would require companies to submit games to Nintendo for approval, similar to the submission process Microsoft uses for Xbox Live Arcade. Early discussions with Microsoft were not positive, but Wilford stated that Nintendo was eager to work with them. "Twisted Pixel was the first company to get a green light for WiiWare." Nintendo later changed its WiiWare model to one that required no submission process. Twisted Pixel opted not to use the service and continued talks with Microsoft. In 2007, Wilford met with David Every, the portfolio planner for Xbox Live Arcade at that time. Twisted Pixel pitched multiple games, including The Maw, which became its first Xbox Live Arcade title.

Released on January 21, 2009, The Maw tells the story of the extraterrestrial Frank and a purple, amorphous creature called The Maw, who have crash-landed their spacecraft on an alien planet. Its second title, 'Splosion Man, is a platform game where players control an escaped science experiment with the ability to explode himself repeatedly. It was released on July 22, 2009. Twisted Pixel's third title, Comic Jumper: The Adventures of Captain Smiley was released on October 6, 2010. Players control Captain Smiley, a comic book hero whose comics are poorly received. Seeking help from Twisted Pixel themselves he "jumps" in other comics, hoping to glean from each genre's popularity. On December 3, 2010, Twisted Pixel announced Ms. Splosion Man, a sequel to 2009's Splosion Man. It was released on July 13, 2011.

On February 1, 2011, the company revealed its fifth original game, The Gunstringer, a third person shooter designed for use with the Xbox 360 Kinect peripheral. The game was originally intended to be the first Xbox Live Arcade game to be featured as a Kinect title but instead became a retail release. It is set as a live-action play set in the Old West. The protagonist, killed by his posse, has been resurrected and seeks revenge. Live action sequences for the game were filmed at The Paramount Theatre in Austin where the company is located.

On September 30, 2015, Twisted Pixel Games announced that it had been separated from Microsoft Studios and had become an independent studio again.

Its games have been generally well-received by critics, and collectively have won several awards. The Maw won the 2008 Audience Choice award at PAX10, and was a finalist at the Independent Games Festival 2009.  Splosion Man was voted by the Xbox Live community as the Best Original Xbox Live Arcade Game of 2009. In a September 2010 ranking, IGN listed it eleventh in its top twenty-five Xbox Live Arcade titles of all time.  It also received several Best of E3 awards in 2009. Captain Smiley, the lead character in Comic Jumper, received the Best New Character award from Official Xbox Magazine in 2010.

On November 14, 2018, it was announced that Ms. Splosion Man would be launching on the Nintendo Switch on November 22.

On December 5, 2021, the website was updated to announce some changes are coming. Through legal documents from the Federal Trade Commission, it became public that Twisted Pixel Games was acquired by Meta in November 2021.

Technology
All of Twisted Pixel's games are powered by Beard, a proprietary engine to compete with Epic Games' Unreal Engine. Content is developed with the company's proprietary Razor editor in conjunction with  RAD Game Tools' Granny 3D animation toolset. Razor can be adapted to develop in 3D or 2.5D configurations. Games are scripted using Lua, which allows the developers to share code between titles.

Games developed

References

External links

 

Video game companies established in 2006
Companies based in Austin, Texas
Video game development companies
Video game companies based in Texas
Former Microsoft subsidiaries
2011 mergers and acquisitions
2021 mergers and acquisitions
Meta Platforms acquisitions
Oculus VR